Zulema Fuentes-Pila Ortiz (born May 25, 1977 in Requejada, Cantabria) is a Spanish middle distance runner.

She finished eighth in 1500 metres at the 2002 European Indoor Championships. At the 2006 European Athletics Championships in Gothenburg she finished eighth in the 3000 m steeplechase, breaking the Spanish national record with 9:40.36 minutes.

She and her sisters Margarita and Iris were selected for the Spanish 2007 European Indoor Championships team.

Competition record

Personal bests
800 metres - 2:03.67 min (2004)
1500 metres - 4:04.72 min (2004)
3000 metres - 8:59.20 min (2004)
3000 metres steeplechase - 9:35.16 min (2008)
5000 metres - 15:56.80 min (2004)

References

External links
 
 
 

1977 births
Living people
Spanish female middle-distance runners
Spanish female steeplechase runners
Athletes from Cantabria
Athletes (track and field) at the 2008 Summer Olympics
Olympic athletes of Spain
Athletes (track and field) at the 2001 Mediterranean Games
Mediterranean Games competitors for Spain